United Against Nuclear Iran (UANI) is a bi-partisan, non-profit advocacy organization in the United States. Its stated objective is to "prevent Iran from fulfilling its ambition to become a regional super-power possessing nuclear weapons." Along with other advocacy campaigns, the organization leads efforts to pressure companies to stop doing business with Iran as a means to halt the Iranian government's nuclear program and its alleged development of nuclear weapons.

In 2014, the United States Department of Justice intervened in a private lawsuit filed against UANI and requested its dismissal on the ground that the continued litigation of the case would jeopardize US national security. The government's motion was granted by a federal judge in 2015, marking a rare expansion of the state secrets privilege into private civil litigation in which the government was not a party.

Leadership
The CEO of the UANI is Mark Wallace, who previously served as U.S. ambassador to the United Nations, representative for UN Management and Reform. Former United States Senator from Connecticut Joe Lieberman serves as the organization's chairman.

Ambassadors Richard Holbrooke and Dennis Ross were the original co-founders and co-chairman of the organization before being appointed to positions in the Obama administration. David Ibsen is  the Executive Director.

In May 2012, UANI formed a transatlantic partnership to prevent a nuclear-armed Iran with the Institute for Strategic Dialogue, a London-based think tank. August Hanning, former president of the Federal Intelligence Service (BND) of Germany, is senior advisor to the initiative.

Funding
The top donors to UANI are a pair of trusts associated with the billionaire Thomas Kaplan and a family foundation operated by Republican mega-donors Sheldon and Miriam Adelson. Together, the funding associated with Kaplan and the Adelson's accounted for more than three-quarters of the group's total revenue of $1.7 million for the 2013 tax year.

Corporate campaigns
UANI runs the Iran Business Registry (IBR), "a running database of reputable media and academic reports of international corporations doing business in Iran." UANI encourages citizens to use the IBR to increase product awareness, divest, contact businesses as well as elected officials. It also calls on companies to sign a declaration to certify their company does not do business with Iran. More than 500 companies are listed on UANI's IBR page.

General Electric

In September 2009, General Electric (GE) signed UANI's "Iran Business Declaration" to not conduct business with Iran. As part of its pledge, GE will donate profits to charitable organizations from the sale of any humanitarian health care products to Iran.

Huntsman

In January 2010, the American chemical company Huntsman said it would discontinue sales in Iran after coming under pressure from United Against Nuclear Iran. UANI reported that one of Huntsman's subsidiaries was selling polyurethanes in Iran, a dual-use material which UANI said could be used in the development of solid rocket fuel. In a statement, Huntsman said, "The small amount of business done there does not justify the reputational risk currently associated with doing business with entities located in Iran due to growing international concern over the policies of the current regime."

Caterpillar

In response to a UANI pressure campaign, the heavy-equipment manufacturer Caterpillar ceased its business in Iran through its non-U.S. subsidiaries. As part of the campaign, UANI erected a roadside billboard near the company's headquarters in Peoria, Illinois which pictured a Caterpillar digger alongside a picture of Mahmoud Ahmadinejad with the slogan "Today's work, Tomorrow's Nuclear Iran."

UANI sought to link the activities of Caterpillar's wholly owned Canadian subsidiary Lovat, a manufacturer of tunnel boring machines, to Iran's alleged construction of tunnels to obscure and shield its nuclear facilities. Additionally, the Iranian company Arya Machinery, which marketed itself on its website as Iran's exclusive dealer of Caterpillar machinery, had been purchasing Caterpillar equipment from a Caterpillar subsidiary in Europe.

Ingersoll Rand

In March 2010, UANI also succeeded in pressuring the U.S. manufacturing corporation Ingersoll Rand to stop doing business in Iran. In a letter to United Against Nuclear Iran, Ingersoll Rand CEO Michael Lamach said that effective immediately, the company would order its foreign subsidiaries to cease any dealings with Iran "in light of very real and escalating concerns about the intentions of the current regime in Iran." At issue was the use of Ingersoll Rand air compressors used in industrial plants run by the state-owned National Iranian Oil Company.

Cranes Campaign

In response to the Iranian government's "execution binge" in 2011, UANI launched its "Cranes Campaign" in March 2011 with the goal of pressuring crane manufacturers worldwide to end their business in Iran in order to prevent the use of their equipment in public executions. Through its campaign, UANI has succeeded in pressuring Terex (U.S.), Tadano (Japan), Liebherr, UNIC (Japan), and Konecranes (Finland) to end their business in Iran. Tadano and UNIC, both of Japan, ended their Iran sales after UANI presented graphic photographic evidence of their cranes being used in public executions in the country.

State secrets case
In July 2013, Greek shipping magnate Victor Restis brought a defamation lawsuit against UANI for claiming that his companies were "front men for the illicit activities of the Iranian regime." In September of the following year, the United States Government (which was not party to the case) filed a motion asserting its right to intervene in the proceedings and requesting that Restis's complaint be dismissed because "continued litigation would risk disclosure" of sensitive matters pertaining to national security. On March 23, 2015 the court granted the government's motion for dismissal. Judge Edgardo Ramos cited four previous cases in which a US court had dismissed a lawsuit on the basis of state secrets when the case did not directly involve the government, but this was the first time in history when the case involved neither the Government itself nor a defense contractor in its employ.

MINERVA Iranian vessel tracking system
In June 2013, UANI launched its Maritime Intelligence Network and Rogue Vessel Analysis (MINERVA) system. The New York Times described this as using "publicly available satellite transmissions from ship transponders, including data on speed, identity, direction and destination, and correlated the information with other navigational data and computer algorithms" to track Iranian vessels potentially violating sanctions. The system then creates "vessel behavior profiles that could identify questionable activities even if the transponders were temporarily turned off." According to UANI, "the system had exposed possible sanctions violations that the group had then publicized, forcing the Iranians or their partners to change plans."

Legislation
In October 2009 Ron Klein (D) and John Mica (R) of Florida introduced the United States House of Representatives Accountability for Business Choices in Iran Act (ABC Iran Act) which would preclude companies that conduct business in Iran from receiving U.S. government contracts. The legislation was created to prevent Iranian business partners like Nokia and Siemens from receiving large government contracts as well as foreign banks like Credit Suisse from receiving federal bailout money. Representative Klein stated, "We need to send a strong message to corporations that we’re not going to continue to allow them to economically enable the Iranian government to continue to do what they have been doing." Klein credited UANI for assisting with drafting the bill. The act fell at the end of the 2009 Congressional session.

Campaigns

Hotels campaign
In the run-up to the September 2009 United Nations General Assembly (UNGA), UANI called on New York hotels and venues to refuse to host Iranian President Mahmoud Ahmadinejad. In its boycott campaign, UANI succeeded in having the Helmsley Hotel cancel his reservation. Gotham Hall, and the Dubai-owned Essex House followed suit.

Criticism
Sasan Fayazmanesh, California State University professor emeritus of Economics, described UANI as a neoconservative organization. He also stated that a video advertisement created by UANI used mostly false and fabricated news to encourage an urgent reaction to its frightening predictions of a nuclear Iran. The video featured suspenseful music, scary pictures of Mahmoud Ahmadinejad, Ruhollah Khomeini, the Iranian revolution and hostage crisis, mobs demonstrating and burning the US flag, massive car bombs from Iraq, and PMOI's demonstrations against the Iranian government, all mixed with pictures of Iran's nuclear facilities.

In 2013, Alireza Miryousefi, a spokesman for Iran's permanent mission to the UN, said the Iranian government considers the activities of UANI "counterproductive and contrary to the policy announced by the new administration in early 2009, which purportedly sought to diplomatically interact with Iran." On September 25, 2019, Iran designated the company a terrorist organization.

During the COVID-19 pandemic in Iran that caused thousands of infections and hundreds of deaths, UANI was pressuring pharmaceutical companies to "end their Iran business." These companies were specifically exempt from sanctions for humanitarian reasons. According to Tyler Cullis, an attorney specializing in sanctions law at Ferrari & Associates: "These groups [including UANI] have sought to impose reputational costs on companies that engage in lawful and legitimate trade with Iran, including humanitarian trade." Despite it being widely reported that existing legal channels for medicinal trade  already did not provide a sufficient flow of medicine and other humanitarian goods to Iran, UANI used name and shame tactics against nine pharmaceutical, biotechnology, and medical-device corporations with special licenses that did still follow these channels.

See also
 Iran and weapons of mass destruction
 U.S. sanctions against Iran

References

External links
 Official website

Foreign policy political advocacy groups in the United States
Foreign policy lobbying organizations in the United States
Iran–United States relations
Nuclear program of Iran
Organisations designated as terrorist by Iran